Mikhail Valentinovich Kovalchuk (born September 21, 1946 in Leningrad, Soviet Union) is a Russian physicist and official. He is a brother of Yury Kovalchuk, known as "Putin's personal banker".

Political activity 
Since May 26, 2000 Mikhail Kovalchuk has been a Corresponding Member of the Russian Academy of Sciences (RAS) in physics.

Since 2001 he has been the Scientific Secretary of the Council for Science and High Technologies attached to the President of the Russian Federation.

Since February 2005 he has been the Director of the Kurchatov Institute.

In June 2007 by a decision of the RAS Presidium Mikhail Kovalchuk was appointed acting vice-president of the Academy for nanotechnology. As the Academy Charter stipulates that only full members are eligible for vice-presidency, Kovalchuk, being a corresponding member, can only be acting vice-president, unless the Charter is modified or he is elected full member.

Despite pressure from Vladimir Putin, the RAS rejected Kovalchuk's application for full membership in May 2008. This was seen as the first major blow to Putin's authority since coming to power in 2000 as there was speculation that Putin had wanted Kovalchuk to become President of the RAS.

References 

1946 births
Living people
Scientists from Saint Petersburg
Members of the Civic Chamber of the Russian Federation
Russian physicists
Russian politicians
Corresponding Members of the Russian Academy of Sciences
Academic staff of the Moscow Institute of Physics and Technology
Full Cavaliers of the Order "For Merit to the Fatherland"